The Esperanza River is a river of on Isla Grande de Tierra del Fuego in Magallanes Region, Chile.

See also
List of rivers of Chile

References
 EVALUACION DE LOS RECURSOS HIDRICOS SUPERFICIALES EN LA CUENCA DEL RIO BIO BIO

Rivers of Chile